Hankey is a small town on the confluence of the Klein and Gamtoos rivers in South Africa.  It is part of the Kouga Local Municipality of the Sarah Baartman District in the Eastern Cape.

History 
Hankey was established in 1826 and is the Gamtoos Valley's oldest town. It was named after the Rev. William Alers Hankey, (1771–1859) an ex-banker and the secretary of the London Missionary Society (LMS). He was born in Aberdeen, Scotland, (though the Missionary Society's successor body's obituary gives the place of his birth as London), the natural son of the London banker, merchant, Jamaica planter and treasurer of the Foundling Hospital, Thomas Hankey of Fetcham Park, and educated, according to his father's 1793 will, at the University of Edinburgh. Sir Maurice Hankey, later Lord Hankey, the creator of the modern UK Cabinet Office, was William Alers Hankey's descendant.

The purpose of the establishment of the village was to grow mielies and corn for the LMS main station at Bethelsdorp and also to carry out evangelistic work. The first property was "Wagondrift" owned by the Damant Bros. And although the town was planned for 250 families it started with 25 families. The first inhabitants consisted of a large number of Khoi, a few Mfengos, a few farmers and mixed "Gamtouer" (1700) descendants.

The LMS founded the station in 1822, terminated it in 1875 and in 1876 it became independent from the LMS. It became a Congregational Church as it is today. The first trustees of the LMS were Dr John Philip and the Rev. William Alers Hankey. The first missionaries were Messrs Miles, Melville, Williams, later the Philips' (Will Enowy and Thom Durant Philip)

Dr John Philip was superintendent. Some of the residents were Windvogel, Diederich, Abraham, Stuurman, Dragoonder, Armoed, Scheepers, Mahtjies, Gerts, Matroos, Konstabel and Kettledas. The first white farmers were Messrs. Wait, Salmon Ferreira, Stefanus Ferreira and the Damant Bros.

The first irrigation scheme on the Klein Rivier was started by James Wait in 1827 and completed in 1830. It extended for 3.5 miles and he was awarded 50 cattle and the use of 50 workers.

What the papers said about the opening of the scheme on the Klein Rivier:

"......the course swung into action sending streams of water down its winding length ....."

People came from far and wide to view the spectacle and Dr Philip later declared it the greatest work of its kind ever undertaken in the Colony. Part of this irrigation scheme can still be seen today and forms part of the Hankey Golf Course.

The second irrigation scheme on the Gamtoos River, a provincial heritage site in Hankey today, was carried out by William Enowy Philip, the son of the Superintendent of the LMS, Dr John Philip. His inspiration was the window in the hill between Backhousehoek and Vensterhoek and was dug using pick and shovel and wheelbarrows. The length of the tunnel is 228 meters and the speed of construction was very slow – about 1 to 2 feet a day. It was started in April 1843 and completed in August 1844 – 15 months later. It was in use from April 1845 to 1970 – a period of 125 years.  Note: This was the first ever tunnel scheme in South Africa.

A tragedy: The builder of the tunnel, William Enowy Philip, drowned on 1 July 1845 in the Gamtoos River "apparently in a desperate but vain attempt to save his ten year old nephew, John Philip Fairbairn. William was only 31 years old at the time." according to the family history book, compiled by Peter Philip in 1980,  "A Fifeshire Family:The Descendants of John and Thomas Philip of Kirkcaldy."

In 1822 Dr John Philip, the superintendent of the London Missionary Society established a mission station on the farm Wagendrift and named it after Reverend William Alers Hankey, the treasurer of the London Missionary Society. An irrigation tunnel constructed under direction of William Philip, the son of Dr John Philip, is today protected as a provincial heritage site.

On 19 August 2002, the remains of Saartjie Baartman were laid to rest on Vergaderingskop, a hill on the edge of town.

As is the case with most South African towns, there are residential areas previously reserved for non-white residents set up on the outskirts of the town.

In 2009, strategically, a handkerchief factory was opened in the area, in order to celebrate the unique name of Hankey, which is also known as the shortened name for a handkerchief. This has contributed significantly to the local economy of the Hankey area.

Transport
Hankey is located on the junction of the R330 and the R331 roads and the Avontuur Railway passes through the town.

See also 
 Saartjie Baartman

References

External links 

Populated places in the Kouga Local Municipality
1826 establishments in the British Empire